The 2021–22 Austrian Football Bundesliga, also known as Admiral Bundesliga for sponsorship reasons, was the 110th season of top-tier football in Austria. The title was won by Red Bull Salzburg for the sixteenth time in their history, and ninth time in a row.

Teams

Changes
St. Pölten was relegated to the 2021-22 Austrian Football Second League after finishing in last place in the 2020-21 Relegation Round. SK Austria Klagenfurt was promoted as champions of the 2020–21 Austrian Football Second League, despite finishing third in that competition. FC Blau-Weiß Linz finished in first, but did not apply for a Bundesliga license  and FC Liefering took second place, but as a feeder team for FC Red Bull Salzburg, were also ineligible for promotion.

Stadia and locations

Regular season

League table

Results

Championship round 
The points obtained during the regular season were halved (and rounded down) before the start of the playoff. As a result, the teams started with the following points before the playoff: Red Bull Salzburg 27, Sturm Graz 18, Wolfsberger AC 18, Austria Wien 16, Rapid Wien 15, and Austria Klagenfurt 15. The points of all teams but Austria Klagenfurt were rounded down – in the event of any ties on points at the end of the playoffs, a half point will be added for these teams.

Relegation round 
The points obtained during the regular season were halved (and rounded down) before the start of the playoff. As a result, the teams started with the following points before the playoff: Ried 14, LASK 12, Tirol 11, Hartberg 11, Admira Wacker 10, and Rheindorf Altach 6. The points of Ried, LASK, Tirol, and Rheindorf Altach were rounded down – in the event of any ties on points at the end of the playoffs, a half point will be added for these teams.

Europa Conference League play-offs
The winner and runner-up of the relegation round, the fifth-placed team from the championship round play to determine the qualifier to the Europa Conference League second qualifying round.

Semi-final

Final

Statistics

Top scorers

Top assists

Awards

Annual awards

Team of the Year

References

Austrian Football Bundesliga seasons
Aus
1